Ciro da Conegliano  (mid-16th century) was an Italian painter, pupil of Paolo Veronese, and active in Verona.

Biography
He died at the age of 30. The relationship to this painter to Cima Da Conegliano, or his son Carlo, or the painter Cesare da Conegliano is unclear.

References

Year of birth missing
Year of death missing
16th-century Italian painters
Italian male painters
Painters from Verona
Place of birth missing